The mayor of Pokhara is the head of the municipal executive of Pokhara Metropolitan City. The role was first created in 1959. 

The current mayor is Dhana Raj Acharya who was elected in the 2022 election. The position has been held by sixteen people since its creation.

The city of Pokhara is governed by the Pokhara Metropolitan City Council and the mayor is supported by the municipal executive which consists of the deputy mayor and ward chairs of all 33 wards of Pokhara.

Power and functions 
The mayor is elected by the residents of Pokhara Metropolitan City for a five-year period that is renewable only once. The municipal executive is formed under the chairmanship of the mayor. Local government in Nepal has authority over the local units pursuant to Schedule 8 of the Constitution of Nepal. The mayor derives its power from the Local Government Operation Act, 2017.

The main functions of the mayor are:

 Summon and chair meetings of the municipal assembly and the municipal executive.
 Table agendas and proposals to the municipal assembly and the municipal executive.
 Prepare and present the annual programmes and budget.
 Enforce the decisions of the assembly and the executive.
 Oversee the work of committees and sub-committees of the municipality and ward committees.

The mayor of Pokhara is also a member of the Kaski District Assembly and the senate of Pokhara University.

Elections 
The mayor is elected though first-past-the-post voting for a period of five-years. In order to qualify as a candidate for mayor, the person must be a citizen of Nepal, must be over the age of twenty-one years, must be a voter who is registered in the electoral roll of Pokhara Metropolitan City and must not be disqualified by law.

List of mayors

Transition period (1959–60)

Panchayat era (1960–1988)

Constitutional monarchy era (1992–2007)

Federal Democratic Republic of Nepal (2017–22)

See also 

 Pokhara
 Mayor of Kathmandu
 Local government in Nepal
 List of mayors of municipalities in Nepal

References 

Lists of political office-holders in Nepal
Pokhara
Pokhara